Konstancin-Jeziorna  is a town in Piaseczno County, Masovian Voivodeship, Poland, with 17,566 inhabitants (as of March 2011, according to GUS).

The town was created in 1969 through combining neighbouring towns: holiday resort Skolimów-Konstancin and industrial Jeziorna with a number of villages.

The town, a 19th-century health spa, sits on the administrative border of the capital city, Warsaw.  The town is known for its historic villas as well as newly built mansions, a shopping center in a restored 19th-century mill and is the home of the American School of Warsaw.
Konstancin-Jeziorna also has a sports team which specializes in football/soccer named Kosa Konstancin created by former professional footballer Roman Kosecki.

Klarysew
There is a district in the town called Klarysew. In the years 1867–1954, it was a settlement in the commune of Jeziorna in the Warsaw poviat. On October 20, 1933, Klarysew formed a cluster within the boundaries of the Jeziorna commune, consisting of the Klarysew settlement and the Bielawa pod Górami settlement.

During World War II the district became part of the General Government, in the Warsaw district. In 1943, Klarysew had 1,353 inhabitants.

From July 1, 1952 it was part of Piaseczno County. Due to the reorganization of the rural administration in the autumn of 1954, Klarysew became part of the Jeziorna Królewska community, together with Gawrońiec, Jeziorna Fabryczna, Jeziorna Królewska, Konstancinek, a plot of Obory and a piece of the town of Skolimów-Konstancin.

On January 1, 1956, the Jeziorna Królewska cluster was transformed into a housing estate called Jeziorna, which made Klarysew an integral part of Konstancin-Jeziorna, and due to the granting of city rights to Jeziorna on July 18, 1962 - part of the city. On January 1, 1969, Jeziorna was combined with Skolimów-Konstancin (municipal rights in 1962) into a new urban center named Konstancin-Jeziorna.

The Wilanów railway station from the second half of the 19th century, located at 64 Warszawska Street, has been preserved in the district (since 2010, there is a branch of the post office No. 4). The station, like the Warszawa Wilanów station, was designed by Konstanty Jakimowicz.

 was popular among the political elite of the Polish People's Republic and some leading officials such as Eduard Gierek had their houses there.

International relations

Twin towns – Sister cities
Konstancin-Jeziorna is twinned with:

 Leidschendam-Voorburg, Netherlands
 Pisogne, Italy
 Saint-Germain-en-Laye, France
 Denzlingen, Germany
 Hranice, Czech Republic
 Kremenets, Ukraine
 Naujoji Vilnia, Lithuania

References

External links

Official town and commune webpage
Jewish Community in Konstancin-Jeziorna on Virtual Shtetl

Cities and towns in Masovian Voivodeship
Konstancin Jeziorna
Warsaw Governorate
Warsaw Voivodeship (1919–1939)
Spa towns in Poland